Dinah Barbara Christie (born 1942) is a Canadian actress and singer.

Christie was born in London, England. One of the five children of actors Robert and Margot Christie, she came to Canada at the age of two with her parents and grew up in Toronto. At age 13, she worked as a call boy at the Stratford Festival and became an apprentice at the Festival in 1960.

In 1961, she sang in a comedy revue in Toronto, directed by her father. Before she was out of her teens, she had been cast in small roles at Stratford. In 1962, aged 19, she starting singing while attending North Toronto Collegiate Institute (NTCI) and performed as a folk singer in her teens, taking voice lessons from Portia White. Christie reached Grade 13 at NTCI but did not graduate.

In 1965, she was selected by Tom Kneebone to co-star in a stage revue, and the two would frequently work together for decades. The same year, she joined CBC Television's This Hour Has Seven Days, for which she regularly sang satirical songs. She also appeared in an off-Broadway musical, Your Own Thing, a rock musical of Twelfth Night.

Christie was a regular performer on the TV series Party Game (1970–1980) and Check it Out! (1985–1988). In 1981, she won an ACTRA Award for best variety performance for her performance on the D.C. and Friends TV special. She and Kneebone won the 1984 ACTRA for best radio variety performers, and Christie won the 1987 Gemini Award for best actress in a continuing series for Check it Out!

Personal life
In 1971, she bought a farm in Ontario, Canada, and lived there with photographer and husband Bob Warren. 
 
In the late 1980s, she founded a design and manufacturing company called "The Badd Sisters", initially with her now deceased sister, Cedar Christie (1946-2021). The company sells products made from hemp and recycled cotton.

References

External links

Profile, BaddSisters.com, accessed May 10, 2014.

1942 births
Living people
Actresses from Toronto
Canadian musical theatre actresses
Canadian television actresses
Canadian television personalities
English emigrants to Canada
Date of birth missing (living people)
Best Actress in a Comedy Series Canadian Screen Award winners
Canadian women television personalities
20th-century Canadian women singers
Canadian expatriates in England